Chrysilla is a genus of jumping spiders that was first described by Tamerlan Thorell in 1887. Several species formerly placed here were transferred to Phintella, and vice versa. The genus is Persian, derived from the Greek .

Species
 it contains ten species, found only in Africa, Asia, and New South Wales:
Chrysilla acerosa Wang & Zhang, 2012 – China
Chrysilla albens Dyal, 1935 – Pakistan
Chrysilla deelemani Prószyński & Deeleman-Reinhold, 2010 – Indonesia (Lombok)
Chrysilla delicata Thorell, 1892 – Myanmar
Chrysilla doriae Thorell, 1890 – Indonesia (Sumatra)
Chrysilla guineensis (Wesolowska & Wiśniewski, 2013) – Guinea
Chrysilla kolosvaryi Caporiacco, 1947 – East Africa
Chrysilla lauta Thorell, 1887 (type) – Sri Lanka, Myanmar, Thailand, Vietnam, China, Taiwan
Chrysilla pilosa (Karsch, 1878) – Australia (New South Wales)
Chrysilla volupe (Karsch, 1879) – Sri Lanka, India, Bhutan

References

External links
 Salticidae.org: Diagnostic drawings and photographs
 Photograph of C. lauta

Salticidae
Salticidae genera
Spiders of Africa
Spiders of Asia
Spiders of Australia
Taxa named by Tamerlan Thorell